Skullcandy Inc. is an American company based in Park City, Utah, that markets headphones, earphones, hands-free devices, audio backpacks, MP3 players, and other products.

Products

Skullcandy's products are primarily targeted at the outdoor action sports demographic (snowboarders, skateboarders, etc.) and general consumer market, but they have expanded in recent years into the premium audio market with products such as the Crusher headphones. Skullcandy products are sold through retailers, specialty outlets, corporate incentive programs and the company's online store.

Company history

Skullcandy was founded by Rick Alden and Cris Williams in 2003. The first Skullcandy product, the Skullcandy Portable Link, was introduced at the 2003 International Consumer Electronics Show (CES) in Las Vegas, Nevada. The LINK system combines headphones with hands-free cellular technology, allowing users to listen to music from a portable audio device, while making and receiving calls through their cellphone. Skullcandy holds a patent for the wireless version of LINK technology.

In December 2008, Skullcandy products were described as "the world's coolest ear bud," by Fortune magazine.

In April 2011, Skullcandy purchased headphones manufacturer Astro Gaming from Astro Studios for an unknown amount of cash.

On January 28, 2011, Skullcandy filed for an initial public offering with the Securities and Exchange Commission. This announcement was met with some criticism from financial press.

On June 24, 2016, Incipio, a maker of phone cases, wireless speakers, and other accessories, announced plans to acquire Skullcandy for $177million; however, the deal later fell through as Incipio refused to submit a proposed amendment to the merger agreement and Skullcandy terminated the agreement. Skullcandy considered numerous other offers, eventually agreeing to be acquired by Mill Road Capital for $196.9million at $6.35 per share. The deal was finalized and completed on October 3, 2016, and the company became a private business again.

References

External links
 Corporate site
 Bloomberg Private Company profile for Skullcandy

American companies established in 2003
Electronics companies established in 2003
Manufacturing companies based in Utah
Headphones manufacturers
Park City, Utah
2003 establishments in Utah
Audio equipment manufacturers of the United States
Privately held companies based in Utah
Companies formerly listed on the Nasdaq